Ron Sigsworth is an Australian former rugby league footballer who played in the 1980s. He played for the Newtown Jets, South Sydney and the Canberra Raiders in the New South Wales Rugby League (NSWRL) competition and for Castleford (Heritage № 633) in England.

Background
Ron Sigsworth is the brother of former Newtown team of the century member Phil Sigsworth.

Playing career
Sigsworth made his first grade debut for Newtown in Round 2 1982 against South Sydney Rabbitohs at Redfern Oval which ended in a 30–0 defeat.  Sigsworth would go on to score 4 tries in 6 games for Newtown in his first season.

Sigsworth played 19 games for Newtown in 1983 which would prove to be the club's last in the top grade of Australian rugby league.  Sigsworth scored Newtown's last ever try in the top grade at Henson Park which was against Balmain in Round 23 1983.  The match was also Sigsworth's last for the club.  Newtown's final ever match in the NSWRL premiership was a 9–6 victory over the Canberra Raiders at Campbelltown Stadium.

Following Newtown's exclusion from the premiership due to financial reasons, Sigsworth signed with Canberra in 1984.  Sigsworth made 13 appearances for Canberra in his only year at the club.

Sigsworth then headed to England and signed with Castleford.  Sigsworth played 2 seasons at Castleford and scored 11 tries in 27 games.

References

1961 births
Living people
Australian rugby league players
Canberra Raiders players
Castleford Tigers players
Newtown Jets players
Rugby league centres
Rugby league fullbacks
Rugby league players from Sydney